The Legend of Sword and Fairy 5, also known as Sword and Fairy 5 or Chinese Paladin 5, is a shenmo/xianxia-themed fantasy adventure role-playing video game developed by Taiwanese game company Softstar Entertainment's Beijing subsidiary. It is the sixth installment in the Legend of Sword and Fairy video game series, and serves as a sequel to the second game, with the plot set around 30 years later.

External links
  Official The Legend of Sword and Fairy website
  Softstar's website
  Official Chinese Paladin Online website

Role-playing video games
Video games set in Imperial China
Chinese-language-only video games
Fantasy video games
5
Video games developed in Taiwan
Video games with isometric graphics
Windows games
Windows-only games
Interquel video games
2011 video games
Single-player video games
Video games based on Chinese mythology